Hemisphaerota is a genus in the subfamily Cassidinae (tortoise beetles and 'hispines') in the family Chrysomelidae. There are about 10 described species in Hemisphaerota.  Biology and morphology has been studied. The distribution range is circum-Caribbean.

Species
These 10 species belong to the genus Hemisphaerota:
 Hemisphaerota besckei (Boheman, 1850)
 Hemisphaerota cyanea (Say, 1824) (palmetto tortoise beetle)
 Hemisphaerota fallax (Suffrian, 1868)
 Hemisphaerota flavipes Zayas, 1989
 Hemisphaerota gundlachi (Boheman, 1862)
 Hemisphaerota materna Zayas, 1952
 Hemisphaerota mulsanti (Boheman, 1856)
 Hemisphaerota palmarum (Boheman, 1856)
 Hemisphaerota quadrimaculata Blake
 Hemisphaerota xanthocera (Boheman, 1850)

References

Further reading

External links

 

Cassidinae
Articles created by Qbugbot